Kaiyum Kalavum is an Indian streaming television series written and directed by Roju Produced by Kalyan Subramanian and Presented by Karthik Subbaraj under his banner Stone Bench films. The series stars Sanchana Natrajan, Rohit, Madonna Sebastian, Karu Pazhaniappan, Senthil, Ramya Nambessan, Vivek Prasanna, Vijay Adiraj. Chinmayi and Simha serve as Narrators of the series. Music and background score was composed by Sundaramurthy KS and songs by Satish Raghunathan Cinematography handled by Sandeep K Vijay and editing was done by Manikandan B and Radha Sridhar. The series was released at SonyLIV on November 04, 2022.

Cast

Narrators
 Chinmayi and Simha

Production 
On October 27, 2022 S J Suryah revealed the first look Poster on Twitter. SonyLiv released the official trailer of the series on October 28, 2022.

Music 
The soundtrack album and background score for Kaiyum Kalavum were composed by Sundaramurthy KS and songs by Satish Raghunathan.

Episodes

Release 
The series was released at SonyLIV on November 04, 2022.

References

External links 
 Kaiyum Kalavum at SonyLIV

SonyLIV original programming
Tamil-language web series
Tamil-language romantic comedy television series
Tamil-language crime television series
2022 Tamil-language television series debuts